KLSS-FM (106.1 MHz) is a radio station in North Central Iowa airing a Top 40 format. The station is licensed to Mason City, Iowa and is owned by Alpha Media License, LLC.

Star 106 hosts the Children's Miracle Network Radiothon each October, which raises money for the Children's Miracle Network and the University Of Iowa Children's Hospital and helps kids and families in need of major medical care.

References

External links
Star 106 official website
Station portal website
 

Mason City, Iowa
Contemporary hit radio stations in the United States
LSS-FM
Radio stations established in 1999
1999 establishments in Iowa